Kitty Is Not a Cat is an Australian animated television series which first aired on 7TWO in Australia on 20 April 2018.

Series overview

Episodes

Season 1 (2018)

Season 2 (2019)

Season 3 (2020)

References

Lists of Australian animated television series episodes